The 2010 Ulster Senior Football Championship was the 122nd installment of the annual Ulster Senior Football Championship held under the auspices of the Ulster GAA. It was won by Tyrone who defeated Monaghan in the final to retain the title they won the previous year. The winning team received the Anglo-Celt Cup, and automatically advanced to the quarter-final stage of the 2010 All-Ireland Senior Football Championship.

2010 was the final year of Armagh and Tyrone's eleven-year sharing of Ulster senior titles. The following year brought the rise of an exciting young Donegal team which consigned the decade-long dominance of those two counties to history.

Bracket

Preliminary round

Quarter-finals

Semi-finals

Final

References

External links
Ulster GAA website

2U
Gaelic
Ulster Senior Football Championship